Salvia bulleyana is a perennial plant that is native to Yunnan province in China, growing on hillsides at  elevation. S. bulleyana grows on a few branched stems with ovate to ovate-triangular leaves.

S. bulleyana is closely related to and commonly mistaken for another Yunnan Salvia, Salvia flava. In Great Britain and the U.S. nursery trade, S. flava is often sold as S. bulleyana. The flowers of S. bulleyana are purple-blue with no spotting, while S. flava  has yellow to yellow-brown flowers with a purple spot on the lower lip.

Notes

bulleyana
Flora of China